Hilary Duff (born 1987) is an American actress, singer-songwriter, entrepreneur, and author.

Hilary Duff may also refer to:
 Hilary Duff (album), the eponymous third studio album by American recording artist Hilary Duff
 Hilary Duff (song), a song by Scott Cain